Huatung Highway is a section of the Provincial Highway No. 9 in Taiwan.  It starts at Hualien City and ends at Taitung City, thus its name. The highway runs the entire length of the Huatung Valley and is flanked by the Central Mountain Range and the Coastal Mountain Range. It was built by the Japanese government in 1933.

Gallery

See also
 Highway system in Taiwan

1933 establishments in Taiwan
Highways in Taiwan
Taiwan under Japanese rule